The 2003 Turkmenistan Higher League (Ýokary Liga) season was the eleventh season of Turkmenistan's professional football league. Ten teams competed in 2003.

Results

External links
 

Ýokary Liga seasons
Turk
Turk
1